Land of the Free is the latest studio album by a German reggae singer Martin Zobel and his band Soulrise. It was released on May 18, 2012 in Europe and ranked in #1 on German Amazon Reggae Charts.

In the United States, "Land of the Free" was released on June 19, 2012 under VPAL/IRIE VIBRATION RECORDS.

Fully Fullwood, a legendary Jamaican roots reggae bassist/musician and producer is associated in producing "Land of the Free". George "Fully" Fullwood is also known as the founder and a leader of the #1 recording/backing Jamaican reggae band, Soul Syndicate.

Track listing

References

2012 albums
Reggae albums by German artists